Thicker than Water is a 1993 Welsh thriller television film directed by Marc Evans and starring Theresa Russell, Jonathan Pryce, Robert Pugh and Catherine Neilson. It is based on the novel of the same name by Dylan Jones, about a Welsh doctor who attempts to put his life together after the death of his pregnant wife.

Plot
Debbie and Jo (both portrayed by Theresa Russell) are identical twins. Jo is killed in a car accident, and her husband, Cardiff physician Sam Crawford (Jonathan Pryce) is grieving for her. Despite this, Debbie starts to act increasingly like Jo for Sam to overcome his grief. Sam meets with, and is drawn to, Chloe (Catherine Neilson), his wife's former colleague. Meanwhile, Debbie, whose fertility problems seems exacerbated by a post-viral weakness, insists that she still feels Jo's presence. Mysterious circumstances lead Sam to suspect that Jo's death wasn't an accident at all.

Cast
 Theresa Russell as Debbie and Jo
 Jonathan Pryce as Sam Crawford
 Robert Pugh as Paul
 Catherine Neilson as Chloe
 Richard Lynch as Dorian Phipps
 Alan David as Chief Superintendent
 Crispin Letts as Nastygram
 Sion Probert as Nastygram agent
 Rhys Parry Jones as Charge Nurse Howard
 Lisa Palfrey as Young mother
 Ri Richards as Young mother
 Zoe Groves as Debbie (aged 8)
 Kristy Groves as Jo (aged 8)

References

External links
 
 Thicker than Water at the BFI

1993 television films
1993 films
British thriller television films
Films directed by Marc Evans
1990s English-language films
1990s British films